Adam Kącki (born October 24, 1998) is a Polish volleyball player, a member of the club KS Lechia Tomaszów Mazowiecki.

References

External links
 Krispol1Liga profile 
 Volleybox profile

1998 births
Living people
Polish men's volleyball players